Thalassotherapy (from the Greek word thalassa, meaning "sea") is the use of seawater as a form of therapy. It also includes the systematic use of sea products and shore climate. There is no scientific evidence that thalassotherapy is effective.

History 
A particularly prominent practitioner was Dr. Richard Russell, whose efforts have been credited with playing a role in the populist "sea side mania of the second half of the eighteenth century", although broader social movements were also at play. In Póvoa de Varzim, Portugal, an area believed to have high concentrations of iodine due to kelp forests, and subject to sea fog, the practice is in historical records since 1725 and was started by Benedictine monks; it expanded to farmers shortly after. In the 19th century, heated saltwater public baths opened and became especially popular with higher classes. Others claim that the practice of thalassotherapy is older: "The origins of thermal baths and related treatments can be traced back to remote antiquity. Romans were firm believers in the virtues of thermalism and thalassotherapy".

Application 
The therapy is applied in various forms, as either showers of warmed seawater, application of marine mud or of algae paste, or the inhalation of sea fog.  Spas make hot seawater and provide mud and seaweed wrapping services.

See also 

 Balneotherapy, the medical use of bathing
 Halotherapy, the medical use of salts
 Water cure (therapy)
 Dead Sea
 Gurney's Seawater Spa and Thalasso Center, the only one of its kind in the continental US.
 Climatotherapy
 Lydia Sarfati, who introduced seaweed skin treatments to United States

References 

Physical therapy
Bathing
Natural environment based therapies
Hydrotherapy